Dirck Rembrantsz van Nierop (1610 – 4 November 1682) was a seventeenth-century Dutch cartographer, mathematician, surveyor, astronomer, shoemaker and Mennonite teacher.

Life
Van Nierop was born and died at Nieuwe Niedorp ("Nierop"), Holland (now in North Holland). Several times he visited Rene Descartes in Egmond-Binnen. The philosopher was so impressed by Van Nierop's knowledge that he even brought him to the attention of Constantijn Huygens and Frans van Schooten. He has more than thirty scientific publications to his name. He also gave many designs of sundials to his name.  In addition he was a consultant in the field of navigational charts and active for the Dutch VOC.  He was the teacher of later celebrities such as:

Jan Albertsz van Dam (teacher Czar Peter the Great, Hoorn 1717)
Pieter Rembrantsz van Nierop (author of numerous books such as almanacs)
Cornelis Pietersz Neuvel to Embden

Books 
 Eenige Oefeningen in Godlijcke, Wiskonstige dingen 1674 at the British Library
 Wiskonstige Musyka 1659 at the British Library
 Tydt beschrijvinge der Werelt 1654 at the National Library Stockholm Sweden
 Verklaringhe over de loop des Hemels 1658 at the University of Göttingen Germany
 Mathematische Calculatie 1659 DRvN and Edmund Wingate, French translation, Harvard University Cambridge Massachusetts USA
 Nieuw groot Stuurmans Zeespiegel 1683 at the Royal Library of Kopenhagen Denmark
 Nieuw Dubbelt Nierper GRAED-BOECK 1660 National Library Stockholm Sweden
 Libro delos grados 1668 publisher H. Doncker Amsterdam Biblioteca Nacional de Espana Madrid
 Nederduytsche Astronomia 1653 publisher Gerrit van Goedesbergh Amsterdam Staatsbibliotheek Berlin Germany
 Nederduytsche Astronomia 1658 publisher Gerrti van Goedesbergh Amsterdam Stanford University California USA
 Onderwys der Zee-vaert 1670 publisher H.Doncker Amsterdam Technische Universiteit Delft
 Nieropper Schatkamer 1676 publisher A.v.d.Storck Amsterdam Koninklijke Bibliotheek Den Haag
 Des Aertrycks-beweging en de Sonne-stilstand 1661 G.v.d.Goedesbergh Amsterdam Stadsarchief Antwerpen België

Books (co-writer) 
 Friesche Sterrekunst 1652 J. Holwarda Harlingen at the British Library
 Rekeningh om te Waecken 1674 J. Stichter Amsterdam Pierpont Morgan Library New York USA
 Kort onderwijs Der Horologien Christiaan Huygens 1665 Huygens Hofwijck Museum Voorburg Den Haag
 Noord en Oost Tartaryen Nicolaas Witsen 1702 Göttingen Documental Zentrum Germany
 Eerste Beginzelen van de Arithmetica of Rekenkunst voor Amsterdamse Schoolen A.Strabbe Amsterdam 1801 Universiteit Jena Germany

Almanacs 
 Zaagmans almanak 1673 publisher J. Stichter Amsterdam Zeeuwse Bibliotheken Middelburg
 Almanach nieuwen-stijl over acht jaren 1681 H. Doncker Amsterdam Universiteit Amsterdam
 Almanach nieuwen-stijl over acht jaren 1687 J. Lootsman Amsterdam Universiteit Leiden
 Almanach tien jaren 1651 Theunisz. Amsterdam Yale University New Haven Connecticut USA
 Almanach spaanstalig 1668 H. Doncker Amsterdam Brown University Providence Rhode Island USA

Letters 
 Wiskunde Christiaan Huygens Den Haag 10 mei 1659 Universiteit Amsterdam
 Cartografie Nicolaas Witsen Amsterdam 9 januari 1682 Universiteit Amsterdam
 Astronomie Hendrik Lanschot Middelburg 23 April 1682 Universiteit Amsterdam

Exhibitions 
 Tijdgebonden: Almanakken en Kalenders Koninklijke Bibliotheek Den Haag Netherland 2000 www.kb.nl.tijdgebonden.html
 Abel Tasman/DR van Nierop at Sydney Australia 2006
 Johan Hevelius/DR van Nierop at Dutch Uurwerkmuseum Zaandam Netherland 2007
 Het vinden der lengtegraad Oost en West at Dutch Uurwerkmuseum Zaandam Netherland 2008
 Almanakken en bijzondere boeken at Regionaal Archief Alkmaar Netherland 2009

Notes

Sources 

 van Nierops Europese Paskaart at report of Christiaan Huygens by Eric Schliesser Caert-Thresoor 4-1997
 Correspondence of letters Dirck Rembrantsz van Nierop by Rienk Vermij 1996 Regionaal Archief Alkmaar
 Mathematische Liefhebberij books yearly (1745–1762) University of Amsterdam
 Nederlands Cartesianisme book Louise Thijsse-Schouten 1954
 Zeewezen en wetenschap book 1985 C.A. Davids
 Oh dear time in 2000 A. Dekker
 The Play Car Edition 1949 and 1951 J. Baken
 Dirck Rembrantsz van Nierop J. Smit 1992 Winkel Catalog
 Inventarisatie werken Dirck Rembrantsz van Nierop Maart 2011 A. Ligthart Zaandam, Regionaal Archief Alkmaar
 Article Noordhollands Newspaper Edition Schagen, November 14, 2007
 The voyage of the Swedish steamer Vega around the world (Europe/Asia/North-East passage) 1878/1879 Adolf Erik Nordenskiöld 1885

External links
The Correspondence of Dirck Rembrantsz van Nierop in EMLO

1610 births
1682 deaths
People from Niedorp
17th-century Dutch mathematicians
17th-century Dutch cartographers